Biopôle is a science park of 80,000 square metres destined to host companies whose main activity is in the life sciences field. While it is open to all therapeutic areas, the main focus is on developing innovative solutions in the fields of oncology, immunology and personalised medicine. Biopôle offers space for industrial research and development or administrative use.

The Biopôle is owned at 98% by the Canton of Vaud. It is located in Épalinges, to the north of Lausanne and is the first of its kind in French-speaking part of Switzerland. The Biopôle site is located at the intersection of the large Lausanne campus, complementing the University Hospital of Lausanne (CHUV), the Swiss Federal Institute of Technology in Lausanne (EPFL), the University of Lausanne and the major industrial concerns.

Notes and references

See also 
 Swiss Innovation Park

External links 

 

Buildings and structures in Lausanne
Science parks in Switzerland